William Frederick Johnson was a Massachusetts politician who served as the seventh Mayor of Lynn, Massachusetts.

Notes

1819 births
Mayors of Lynn, Massachusetts
Year of death missing